A referendum on the death penalty was held in the United States Virgin Islands on 7 November 1978, in response to a decree by the Governor of the Islands.  He requested a non-binding consultative referendum be held in conjunction with the next general election.

Results
Voting Question:

References

Referendums in the United States Virgin Islands
1978 in the United States Virgin Islands
1978 referendums
1978 elections in the Caribbean
Capital punishment